Mimmi Paulsson-Febo (born 1 June 1994) is a Swedish football goalkeeper.

Honours 
KIF Örebro DFF
Runner-up
 Damallsvenskan: 2014

References

External links 
 
 
 
 
 KIF Örebro DFF player profile
 

1994 births
Living people
Swedish women's footballers
IK Sirius Fotboll players
KIF Örebro DFF players
Damallsvenskan players
Women's association football goalkeepers